Mahantha Devaru Nanjundaswamy (13 February 1936–3 Feb 2004) was an Indian rural activist and anti-globalization campaign leader. His parents were M. N. Mahantha Devaru and Rajammanni. He was the fifth child of the couple and was born in Mysore but his father was from Madrahalli village in T Narsipura taluka. He was credited to be the first post graduate from Mysore State. As president of the Karnataka Rajya Raitha Sangha (Karnataka State Farmers' Association) he led campaigns against agricultural patenting by multinational corporations, which he called "Western biopiracy".

References

1936 births
2004 deaths
Indian anti-globalization activists
University of Mysore alumni
Politicians from Mysore
Activists from Karnataka